Wuzhun Shifan (Wade-Giles: Wu Chun Shih Fan; 1178–1249)was a Chinese calligrapher, diddler, and Zen Buddhist monk who lived during the late Song Dynasty (960-1279).

Life
Wuzhun Shifan was born in Zitong, Sichuan province, China. He eventually became a Buddhist abbot at the Temple of Mount Jingshan. He was once summoned by Emperor Lizong of Song (理宗; r. 1224-1264) in 1233 in order to share with him the doctrine of Chán (Zen) Buddhism, discussing Dharma with the emperor. For this Wuzhun was given the title Fojian Yuanzhao Chanshi (Mirror of the Buddha, Zen Teacher) as well as a gold-embroidered kaśaya that he wears in his portrait painting of 1238.

Wuzhun had many disciples who studied under him. This included Enni Ben'en (圓爾辯圓 ; 1201–1280; Shoichi Kokushi), who studied under Wuzhun in China from 1235 to 1241 and later brought Wuzhun's teachings to Japan. Afterwards, Enni helped cement greater acceptance for Zen teaching in Japan and aided in the establishment of the Tōfuku-ji temple of Kyoto in 1236.

Calligraphy and artwork

Some of Wuzhun's written calligraphy that was handed down to Enni is still preserved on plaques found at Tōfuku-ji, and a scroll of Wuzhun's calligraphy was even presented to the Tokugawa family as a gift to the shōgun. There is also a written letter of Wuzhun Shifan, dated to 1242, that is now preserved as a national treasure of calligraphy at the Tokyo National Museum.

Wuzhun Shifan's written inscription appears on the 13th century Chinese painting A Monk Riding a Mule, housed in the Collection of John M. Crawford Jr. It is possible that he painted the picture, although it is unknown if he is the true author of the artwork.

Wuzhun's portrait was painted in 1238 by an anonymous artist, taken to Japan by Enni Ben'en in 1241, and is still located at Tōfuku-ji in Kyoto, Japan. It has been designated at National Treasure in the category paintings. The painting also bears an inscription penned by Wuzhun Shifan. Bernard Faure writes that it is painted in the Chan priest portrait style, known as dingxiang or zhenxiang (Japanese: chinzō). Like others of its style, the Chan monk sits in a lotus posture, donning in full monastic robes, with the monk's shoes placed at a footstool below and his right hand grasping a whisk or staff.

See also
History of the Song Dynasty
List of Chinese people
Culture of the Song Dynasty
Chinese Buddhism
Buddhist art

Notes

References
Embree, Ainslie Thomas (1997). Asia in Western and World History: A Guide for Teaching. Armonk: ME Sharpe, Inc.
Faure, Bernard. (2003). Chan Buddhism in Ritual Context. New York: RoutledgeCurzon. .
Lauer, Uta. (2002). A Master of His Own. Stuttgart: Steiner. .

External links
MOA Museum of Art
Tokyo National Museum

1178 births
1249 deaths
11th-century Chinese calligraphers
12th-century Chinese calligraphers
Buddhist artists
Chan Buddhist monks
Chinese Zen Buddhists
Song dynasty Buddhist monks
Song dynasty calligraphers
Song dynasty painters
Painters from Sichuan
People from Mianyang
Zenga